Leonidas D. Veliaroutis (23 November 1916 – 17 March 2020) was a Greek writer. He was born in Grammeno, Zitsa. He turned 100 in November 2016 and died in March 2020 at the age of 103.

Works
Encyclopedias
Public School Encyclopedia (Εγκυκλοπαίδεια του Δημοτικού Σχολείου = Egkyklopedia tou Dimotikou Sholeiou)O Symvoulos ton neon (Ο Σύμβουλος των νέων = The Youth Council)Sholiki Ydria (Σχολική Υδρία)Ydria (Υδρία = Jug)

Syntactic team and anthologies:Literary Foundations (Λογοτεχνικό Θεμέλιο = Logotechniko themelio)

Works on his studies:Lambros Malamas (Λάμπρος Μάλαμας) (1965)The environmental studies (Η μελέτη του περιβάλλοντος = I meleti tou perivallontos) (1967)To neoelliniko ekpaidevtiko systima) (Το νεοελληνικό εκπαιδευτικό σύστημα = Modern Greek Children's Systrem) (1984)Ta pedia ke to logotehniko vivlio (Τα παιδιά και το λογοτεχνικό βιβλίο = The Children and the Literary Book) (1985)I techni n' afigoumaste ena paramythi (Η τέχνη ν' αφηγούμαστε ένα παραμύθι = Works That Narrate A Tale) (1991)

BooksMaria Lamparidou-Pothou - Her Life And Her Works (Μαρία Λαμπαδαρίδου-Πόθου - Η ζωή και το έργο της = Maria Lamparidou-Pothou - I zoi kai to ergo tis) (1995)Ipeirotes logotechnes apo to Grammeno (Ηπειρώτες λογοτέχνες από το Γραμμένο = Epirot Writers From Grammeno) (2002)I Kalithea (Sarpi) tis Limnou ke i Palelogiki Sholi tis - Limnioi logotehnes (Η Καλλιθέα (Σαρπί) της Λήμνου και η Παλαιολογική Σχολή της – Λήμνιοι λογοτέχνες = Kallithea (Sarpi) on Lemnos and their Paleologiki School - Lemnian Writers'') (R. Segkopoulou - N. Viglas - M. Lampadaridou), 2007

References

1916 births
2020 deaths
Greek centenarians
Men centenarians

People from Ioannina (regional unit)